Burnham Sterling & Company is an aircraft consulting and advisory practice led by former senior members of Babcock & Brown. The traditional aircraft advisory activities formerly offered by Babcock are now offered by Burnham Sterling and continue to be led by former Babcock partner, Michael Dickey Morgan. Burnham Sterling operates its aircraft advisory practice from Babcock’s former offices in Cos Cob, Connecticut. The company is headed by Michael Dickey Morgan, 20 years at Babcock & Brown, most recently at head of the aircraft advisory business.

Some of the services Burnham Sterling provides are:

 Operating leases and Sale/Leasebacks
 Tax-leases
- US, Germany, Japan and other venues
 Aircraft sourcing
 Financial, asset and tax analysis

On October 10, 2012, Burnham Sterling & Company (BSC) was retained by Scandinavian Airlines System (SAS) for the sourcing of 5 additional Airbus A320s. In 2011 BSC had successfully completed a similar exercise for 10 A320 aircraft for SAS.

References

External links
Official website of Burnham Sterling & Company.
Burnham Sterling's Linkedin profile page.

Aircraft leasing companies